The Parish of North Colah is a civil parish of the County of Cumberland.

The Parish is in the Hundred of Dundas and Hornsby Shire Council. Much of the parish is National Park, the main town of the parish is Mount Colah, and the Sydney to Newcastle Freeway and Central Coast and Sydney to Newcastle Railway Lines pass through the Parish.

References

Parishes of Cumberland County